Carenum floridum is a species of ground beetle in the subfamily Scaritinae. It was described by Sloane in 1917.

References

floridum
Beetles described in 1917